Sybrand Jacobus Lodewikus "Louis" van Schoor (born 1951), known as The Apartheid Killer, is a South African serial killer, former policeman and security guard who committed murders between 1986 and 1989. He was convicted of seven murders and two assassinations. However, in an interview, he did not deny murdering more than 100 people.

See also
List of serial killers by country
List of serial killers by number of victims

References 

1951 births
Living people
Male serial killers
Vigilantes
South African serial killers
South African people convicted of murder
People convicted of murder by South Africa